Maardu  is a town and a municipality in Harju County, Estonia. The town covers an area of 22.76 km² and has a population of 16,170 (as of 1 January 2021).

The Port of Muuga, the largest cargo port in Estonia, is partly located in Maardu.

According to the 2000 Census, the population was 16,738. 61.7% were Russians, 19.9% Estonians, 6.6% Ukrainians, 5.7% Belarusians, 1.5% Tatars, 0.9% Finns, 0.6% Poles, 0.5% Lithuanians, 0.2% Latvians, 0.2% Germans and 0.1% Jews and 1 Cuban. The proportion of Estonians was one of the lowest (if not the lowest) in Central and Western Estonia.

Outside the town (in Maardu village), south of the road to Narva lies Maardu manor, one of the oldest preserved baroque manor houses in Estonia. It traces its origins to 1389, but the current building dates from the 1660s with additions made in the 19th century. The landlord of the manor Herman Jensen Bohn in 1739 funded the printing of the first bible printed in Estonian.

Maardu neighborhoods
Maardu may be divided into six parts:
Kallavere (the centre of the city where most of the public institutions are located)
Muuga Harbour
Muuga aedlinn (former garden city, now a light residential suburb more connected to Tallinn than Kallavere)
Kärmu (industrial area)
Kroodi (industrial area)
Lake Maardu

Religion

Gallery

See also
Maardu Linnameeskond
Maardu United

References

External links

  
 

Cities and towns in Estonia
Populated places in Harju County
Municipalities of Estonia
Russian communities